The Klausen Synagogue (kloyz shul) is nowadays the largest synagogue in the former Prague Jewish ghetto and the sole example of an early Baroque synagogue in the ghetto. Today the synagogue is administered by the Jewish Museum in Prague.

History

Beginnings 

In 1570s a renowned businessman and benefactor of the ghetto, Mordechai Maisel, decided to build in the area of the present Klausen Synagogue a kloyz, or complex of buildings, probably including synagogues and a private Talmudic school. The famous Prague rabbi and scholar Maharal taught at this school. In 1689, the great fire of the ghetto burned down all the kloyzn and the synagogue is named after them.

Shelomo Khalish Cohen, a rabbi of the burned down synagogue, which had been part of the complex, then initiated construction of a new synagogue in early baroque style at the site. In 1694, the building was finished and two years later monumental three-tiered aron ha-kodesh, the Torah Ark, was added, thanks to the endowment of Samuel Oppenheimer, an affluent and influential personality of the Austrian monarchy, part of which Prague was at the time. Many important rabbis, for example Elazar Fleckeles, are also connected with the synagogue.

Modern times 
In 1883–84, the synagogue was reconstructed by an architect Bedřich Münzberger, who also partook in decorating the Spanish Synagogue.  Massive urban renewal of the ghetto at the turn of the 20th century left the Klausen Synagogue intact, while other baroque synagogues such as the Zigeuner, Great Court and New Synagogue were demolished. Nowadays, the Klausen Synagogue is thus the only example of a baroque synagogue in the former ghetto.

During the World War II a depository as well as an exposition was located in the synagogue. As soon as one year after the war, an exposition about Jewish festivals and customs was opened there. The synagogue was reconstructed in years 1960, 1979–81 and 1983 (aron ha-kodesh only). One year after the last mentioned reconstruction, a new permanent exhibition of Hebrew manuscripts and early prints was opened.

Recent history and exposition 
About a decade later, during years 1995–96, the synagogue was restored again and the topic of Jewish festivals and customs returned to the exposition. Visitors are invited to get acquainted with the foundational texts of Judaism (Torah and Talmud), sacral space of Judaism (traditional components of the synagogue interior, order of synagogue prayer service and texts and objects used during it, etc.). Introduction of Jewish Festivals and Jewish family life in its dailiness as well as in its important milestones, for instance birth, circumcision, wedding, etc. follows. The exposition continues in the Ceremonial Hall with the topic of the end of life.

Sources

Literature 
 PAŘÍK, Arno, Dana CABANOVÁ a Petr KLIMENT, Pražské synagogy = Prague Synagogues = Prager Synagogen, 2. vyd., Praha: Židovské muzeum v Praze, 2011, s. 74–83.
 PAŘÍK, Arno "Pražským ghettem po stopách Maharala" in Putík, Alexandr (ed.), Cesta životem: Rabi Jehuda Leva ben Becalel kol. 1525–1609, Praha: Academia a Židovské muzeum v Praze, s.246–271. = "Following Maharal on the way through the Prague Ghetto" in Path of Life: Rabbi Judah Loew ben Bezalel (ca. 1525–1609), etc.

External links 

 Jewish Museum: Klausen Synagogue

Synagogues in Prague
Museums in Prague
Former synagogues in the Czech Republic
Synagogues preserved as museums
Baroque synagogues
Josefov (Prague)